The Second Ōkuma Cabinet is the 17th Cabinet of Japan led by Ōkuma Shigenobu from April 16, 1914, to October 9, 1916.

Cabinet

Reshuffled Cabinet 
A Cabinet reshuffle took place on August 10, 1915.

References 

Cabinet of Japan
1914 establishments in Japan
Cabinets established in 1914
Cabinets disestablished in 1916